The American Narrows is a channel in Jefferson County, New York. It refers to a very narrow but deep section of the St. Lawrence River near Alexandria Bay, New York. With its strong currents and jagged rocks it has been the cause of demise for more than one vessel. It was the site of the NEPCO 140 Oil Spill in 1976.

See also
 A.E. Vickery
 Thousand Islands
 Boldt Castle
 Alexandria Bay, New York

External links
  Speed & Noise in the American Narrows

References

Channels of New York (state)
Bodies of water of Jefferson County, New York